Sandra Hunt (born June 14, 1959) is a former soccer referee from the United States. She was a FIFA referee from 1999 to 2004 and currently works as a referee coach for Professional Referee Organization (PRO). Hunt was selected for the FIFA Women's World Cup in 1999 and 2003, as well as the 2000 Sydney Olympics.

Hunt, from Bellingham, Washington began refereeing in 1987. In August 1998 Hunt became one of the first two women to officiate in Major League Soccer (MLS), overseeing a match in Kansas City as Nancy Lay-McCormick simultaneously refereed a match in Dallas. Hunt also refereed in Women's United Soccer Association (WUSA).

References

1959 births
Living people
American soccer referees
FIFA Women's World Cup referees
Olympic football referees
Women association football referees
Major League Soccer referees
Sportspeople from Bellingham, Washington
American women referees and umpires